The University of Illinois at Chicago's School of Public Health is public health school recognized by the Council on Education for Public Health that awards undergraduate and graduate degrees in public health and health administration. Located on UIC's West Campus:, the School of Public Health was founded in 1970 as an expansion of the University of Illinois Medical Center. It later, along with rest of UIMC, was consolidated into the University of Illinois at Chicago. Now constituting one of the 15 colleges of UIC, the school is ranked seventeenth in public health programs in the U.S. News & World Report rankings.

History 
Based on the recommendation of Illinois Board of Higher Education, the Illinois legislature in 1969 approved the expansion of the University of Illinois Medical Center's academic programs that included a new school of public health.

Academics 
Initially awarding a Masters of Public Health and Doctorate of Public Health, the School of Public Health has grown to include the following degree options:

Bachelor of Arts
Master of Public Health (MPH) and Master of Science (MS) with concentrations in
 Community Health Sciences
 Epidemiology and Biostatistics
 Environmental and Occupational Health Sciences
 Health Policy and Administration
Master of Health Administration (MHA)
Doctorate of Public Health (DrPH)
Doctorate of Philosophy (PhD)

the UIC School of Public Health also maintains a Master's International program for Peace Corps volunteers

Research 

The UIC School of Public Health has multiple areas of research and has established the multiple research centers and institutes. It also maintains the GEOLibrary

Notable alumni
 Michael VanRooyen co-founder and current Director of the Harvard Humanitarian Initiative
 Sara Feigenholtz member of the Illinois House of Representatives

Notable faculty
  Gary Slutkin founded Cure Violence
 Samuel Epstein
 S. Jay Olshansky

References

Medical and health organizations based in Illinois
Schools of public health in the United States
Educational institutions established in 1970
1970 establishments in Illinois